Fisnik Zuka (born 3 September 1995) is a Macedonian footballer of Albanian descent who plays for KF Shkupi in the Macedonian First Football League.

Club career

Shkupi
Zuka started his senior career with the club. He made his First League debut for the club on 9 August 2015 in a 2-2 away draw with Vardar, coming on as a 90th minute substitute for Ardian Nuhiu. He scored his first goal in the Macedonian top flight on 16 November 2016 in a 1-1 home draw with FK Pobeda. His goal, scored in the 24th minute, made the score 1-0 to Shkupi.

Flamurtari
In January 2018, Zuka moved to Albanian Superliga club Flamurtari Vlorë. He made his competitive debut for the club on 26 January 2018 in a 1-0 victory in the league over Partizani Tirana, coming on as a 65th minute substitute for Ardit Hoxhaj.

Renova
In July 2018, Zuka moved back to Macedonia, signing with First League club FK Renova. He made his competitive debut for the club on 11 August 2018 in a 4-3 away victory over FK Rabotnički, playing all ninety minutes of the match.

References

External links
Profile at Football Database

1995 births
Living people
Footballers from Skopje
Albanian footballers from North Macedonia
Association football fullbacks
Macedonian footballers
FK Shkupi players
Flamurtari Vlorë players
FK Renova players
FK Rabotnički players
Macedonian First Football League players
Kategoria Superiore players
Macedonian expatriate footballers
Expatriate footballers in Albania
Macedonian expatriate sportspeople in Albania